The Western Miombo sunbird (Cinnyris gertrudis) is a species of bird in the family Nectariniidae. It is found in western Africa.

References

External links
 Miombo double-collared sunbird - Species text in The Atlas of Southern African Birds.

Western Miombo sunbird
Birds of Southern Africa
Birds described in 1965